Apostolepis niceforoi, the Colombian blackhead or Amazon burrowing snake, is a species of snake in the family Colubridae. It is endemic to Colombia.

References 

niceforoi
Reptiles described in 1935
Reptiles of Colombia
Taxa named by Afrânio Pompílio Gastos do Amaral